Mandarin is a group of Chinese (Sinitic) dialects that are natively spoken across most of northern and southwestern China. The group includes the Beijing dialect, the basis of the phonology of Standard Chinese, the official language of China. Because Mandarin originated in North China and most Mandarin dialects are found in the north, the group is sometimes referred to as Northern Chinese. Many varieties of Mandarin, such as those of the Southwest (including Sichuanese) and the Lower Yangtze, are not mutually intelligible  with the standard language (or are only partially intelligible). Nevertheless, Mandarin as a group is often placed first in lists of languages by number of native speakers (with nearly one billion).

Mandarin is by far the largest of the seven or ten Chinese dialect groups; it is spoken by 70 percent of all Chinese speakers over a large geographical area that stretches from Yunnan in the southwest to Xinjiang in the northwest and Heilongjiang in the northeast. This is generally attributed to the greater ease of travel and communication in the North China Plain compared to the more mountainous south, combined with the relatively recent spread of Mandarin to frontier areas. The second most spoken is Yue ("Cantonese" because it includes the Cantonese variety).

Most Mandarin varieties have four tones. The final stops of Middle Chinese have disappeared in most of these varieties, but some have merged them as a final glottal stop. Many Mandarin varieties, including the Beijing dialect, retain retroflex initial consonants, which have been lost in southern varieties of Chinese.

The Chinese capital has been within the Mandarin-speaking area for most of the last millennium, making these dialects very influential. Some form of Mandarin has served as a lingua franca for government officials and the courts since the 14th century. By the early 20th century, a standard form based on the Beijing dialect, with elements from other Mandarin dialects, was adopted as the national language. Standard Mandarin Chinese is the official language of the People's Republic of China and Taiwan, as well as one of the four official languages of Singapore. It is also used as one of the official languages of the United Nations. Recent increased migration from Mandarin-speaking regions of China and Taiwan has now resulted in the language being one of the more frequently used varieties of Chinese among Chinese diaspora communities. It is also the most commonly taught Chinese variety.

Name
The English word "mandarin" (from Portuguese mandarim, from Malay menteri, from Sanskrit mantrī, mantrin, meaning 'minister or counsellor') originally meant an official of the Ming and Qing empires.
Since their native varieties were often mutually unintelligible, these officials communicated using a Koiné language based on various northern varieties. When Jesuit missionaries learned this standard language in the 16th century, they called it "Mandarin", from its Chinese name Guānhuà or 'language of the officials'.

In everyday English, "Mandarin" refers to Standard Chinese, which is often called simply "Chinese". Standard Mandarin Chinese is based on Beijing dialect, with some lexical and syntactic influence from other Mandarin dialects. It is the official spoken language of the People's Republic of China (PRC) and Taiwan (Republic of China, ROC), as well as one of the four official languages of Singapore, and a high-prestige minority language in Malaysia. It also functions as the language of instruction in Mainland China and Taiwan. It is one of the six official languages of the United Nations, under the name "Chinese". Chinese speakers refer to the modern standard language as
 Pǔtōnghuà (literally 'common speech') in Mainland China,
 Guóyǔ (literally 'national language') in Taiwan or
 Huáyǔ (literally 'Hua (Chinese) language') in Malaysia and Singapore,
but not as Guānhuà.

Linguists use the term "Mandarin" to refer to the diverse group of dialects spoken in northern and southwestern China, which Chinese linguists call Guānhuà. The alternative term Běifānghuà or "Northern dialects", is used less and less among Chinese linguists. By extension, the term "Old Mandarin" or "Early Mandarin" is used by linguists to refer to the northern dialects recorded in materials from the Yuan dynasty.

Native speakers who are not academic linguists may not recognize that the variants they speak are classified in linguistics as members of "Mandarin" (or so-called "Northern dialects") in a broader sense. Within Chinese social or cultural discourse, there is not a common "Mandarin" identity based on language; rather, there are strong regional identities centred on individual dialects because of the wide geographical distribution and cultural diversity of their speakers. Speakers of forms of Mandarin other than the standard typically refer to the variety they speak by a geographic name—for example the Sichuan dialect and the Hebei dialect or Northeastern dialect, all being regarded as distinct from the standard language, with which they may not share much mutual intelligibility.

History

The hundreds of modern local varieties of Chinese developed from regional variants of Old Chinese and Middle Chinese. Traditionally, seven major groups of dialects have been recognized. Aside from Mandarin, the other six are Wu, Gan, and Xiang in central China and Min, Hakka, and Yue on the southeast coast. The Language Atlas of China (1987) distinguishes three further groups: Jin (split from Mandarin), Huizhou in the Huizhou region of Anhui and Zhejiang, and Pinghua in Guangxi and Yunnan.

Old Mandarin

After the fall of the Northern Song (959–1126) and during the reign of the Jin (1115–1234) and Yuan (Mongol) dynasties in northern China, a common form of speech developed based on the dialects of the North China Plain around the capital, a language referred to as Old Mandarin. New genres of vernacular literature were based on this language, including verse, drama and story forms, such as the qu and sanqu poetry.

The rhyming conventions of the new verse were codified in a rime dictionary called the Zhongyuan Yinyun (1324). A radical departure from the rime table tradition that had evolved over the previous centuries, this dictionary contains a wealth of information on the phonology of Old Mandarin. Further sources are the 'Phags-pa script based on the Tibetan alphabet, which was used to write several of the languages of the Mongol empire, including Chinese and the Menggu Ziyun, a rime dictionary based on 'Phags-pa. The rime books differ in some details, but overall show many of the features characteristic of modern Mandarin dialects, such as the reduction and disappearance of final plosives and the reorganization of the Middle Chinese tones.

In Middle Chinese, initial stops and affricates showed a three-way contrast between tenuis, voiceless aspirated and voiced consonants. There were four tones, with the fourth or "entering tone", a checked tone comprising syllables ending in plosives (-p, -t or -k). Syllables with voiced initials tended to be pronounced with a lower pitch and by the late Tang dynasty, each of the tones had split into two registers conditioned by the initials. When voicing was lost in all languages except the Wu subfamily, this distinction became phonemic and the system of initials and tones was rearranged differently in each of the major groups.

The Zhongyuan Yinyun shows the typical Mandarin four-tone system resulting from a split of the "even" tone and loss of the entering tone, with its syllables distributed across the other tones (though their different origin is marked in the dictionary). Similarly, voiced plosives and affricates have become voiceless aspirates in the "even" tone and voiceless non-aspirates in others, another distinctive Mandarin development. However, the language still retained a final -m, which has merged with -n in modern dialects and initial voiced fricatives. It also retained the distinction between velars and alveolar sibilants in palatal environments, which later merged in most Mandarin dialects to yield a palatal series (rendered j-, q- and x- in pinyin).

The flourishing vernacular literature of the period also shows distinctively Mandarin vocabulary and syntax, though some, such as the third-person pronoun tā (他), can be traced back to the Tang dynasty.

Vernacular literature
Until the early 20th century, formal writing and even much poetry and fiction was done in Literary Chinese, which was modeled on the classics of the Warring States period and the Han dynasty. Over time, the various spoken varieties diverged greatly from Literary Chinese, which was learned and composed as a special language. Preserved from the sound changes that affected the various spoken varieties, its economy of expression was greatly valued. For example,  (yì, "wing") is unambiguous in written Chinese, but has over 75 homophones in Standard Chinese.

The literary language was less appropriate for recording materials that were meant to be reproduced in oral presentations, materials such as plays and grist for the professional story-teller's mill. From at least the Yuan dynasty plays that recounted the subversive tales of China's Robin Hoods to the Ming dynasty novels such as Water Margin, on down to the Qing dynasty novel Dream of the Red Chamber and beyond, there developed a literature in written vernacular Chinese (白話/白话, báihuà). In many cases, this written language reflected Mandarin varieties and since pronunciation differences were not conveyed in this written form, this tradition had a unifying force across all the Mandarin-speaking regions and beyond.

Hu Shih, a pivotal figure of the first half of the twentieth century, wrote an influential and perceptive study of this literary tradition, entitled Báihuà Wénxuéshǐ ("A History of Vernacular Literature").

Koiné of the Late Empire

Until the mid-20th century, most Chinese people living in many parts of South China spoke only their local variety. As a practical measure, officials of the Ming and Qing dynasties carried out the administration of the empire using a common language based on Mandarin varieties, known as Guānhuà. Knowledge of this language was thus essential for an official career, but it was never formally defined.

Officials varied widely in their pronunciation; in 1728, the Yongzheng Emperor, unable to understand the accents of officials from Guangdong and Fujian, issued a decree requiring the governors of those provinces to provide for the teaching of proper pronunciation. Although the resulting Academies for Correct Pronunciation were short-lived, the decree did spawn a number of textbooks that give some insight into the ideal pronunciation. Common features included:
 loss of the Middle Chinese voiced initials except for v-
 merger of -m finals with -n
 the characteristic Mandarin four-tone system in open syllables, but retaining a final glottal stop in "entering tone" syllables
 retention of the distinction between palatalized velars and dental affricates, the source of the spellings "Peking" and "Tientsin" for modern "Beijing" and "Tianjin".

As the last two of these features indicate, this language was a koiné based on dialects spoken in the Nanjing area, though not identical to any single dialect. This form remained prestigious long after the capital moved to Beijing in 1421, though the speech of the new capital emerged as a rival standard. As late as 1815, Robert Morrison based the first English–Chinese dictionary on this koiné as the standard of the time, though he conceded that the Beijing dialect was gaining in influence. By the middle of the 19th century, the Beijing dialect had become dominant and was essential for any business with the imperial court.

Standard Mandarin Chinese

The variant of Mandarin as spoken by educated classes in Beijing was made the official language of China by the Qing dynasty in the early 1900s and the successive Republican government. In the early years of the Republic of China, intellectuals of the New Culture Movement, such as Hu Shih and Chen Duxiu, successfully campaigned for the replacement of Literary Chinese as the written standard by written vernacular Chinese, which was based on northern dialects. A parallel priority was the definition of a standard national language. After much dispute between proponents of northern and southern dialects and an abortive attempt at an artificial pronunciation, the National Language Unification Commission finally settled on the Beijing dialect in 1932. The People's Republic, founded in 1949, retained this standard, calling it pǔtōnghuà. Some 54% of speakers of Mandarin varieties could understand the standard language in the early 1950s, rising to 91% in 1984.  Nationally, the proportion understanding the standard rose from 41% to 90% over the same period.

This standard language is now used in education, the media, and formal occasions in both Mainland China and Taiwan, as well as among the Chinese community of Singapore. However in other parts of the Chinese-speaking world, namely Hong Kong and Macau, the standard form of Chinese used in education, the media, formal speech, and everyday life remains the local Cantonese because of their colonial and linguistic history. While Standard Mandarin is now the medium of instruction in schools throughout China, it still has yet to gain traction as a common language among the local population in areas where Mandarin dialects are not native. In these regions,  people may be either diglossic or speak the standard language with a notable accent. However since the 21st century, there has been an effort of mass education in Standard Mandarin Chinese and discouragement of local language usage by the Chinese government in order to erase these regional differences.

From an official point of view, the mainland Chinese and the Taiwanese governments maintain their own forms of the standard under different names. Technically, both Pǔtōnghuà and Guóyǔ base their phonology on the Beijing accent, though Pǔtōnghuà also takes some elements from other sources. Comparison of dictionaries produced in the two areas will show that there are few substantial differences. However, both versions of "school-standard" Chinese are often quite different from the Mandarin varieties that are spoken in accordance with regional habits, and neither is wholly identical to the Beijing dialect. Pǔtōnghuà and Guóyǔ also have some differences from the Beijing dialect in vocabulary, grammar, and pragmatics.

The written forms of Standard Chinese are also essentially equivalent, although simplified characters are used in mainland China and Singapore, while traditional characters remain in use in Taiwan, Hong Kong, and Macau. Overseas communities also tend to use traditional Chinese characters, although younger generations in Malaysia increasingly use simplified characters due to influence from Singapore and mainland China.

Geographic distribution

Mainland China
Most Han Chinese living in northern and southwestern China are native speakers of a dialect of Mandarin. The North China Plain provided few barriers to migration, leading to relative linguistic homogeneity over a wide area in northern China. In contrast, the mountains and rivers of southern China have spawned the other six major groups of Chinese varieties, with great internal diversity, particularly in Fujian.

However, the varieties of Mandarin cover a huge area containing nearly a billion people. As a result, there are pronounced regional variations in pronunciation, vocabulary, and grammar, and many Mandarin varieties are not mutually intelligible.

Most of northeast China, except for Liaoning, did not receive significant settlements by Han Chinese until the 18th century, and as a result the Northeastern Mandarin dialects spoken there differ little from the Beijing dialect. The Manchu people of the area now speak these dialects exclusively; their native language is only maintained in northwestern Xinjiang, where Xibe, a modern dialect, is spoken.

The frontier areas of northwest China were colonized by speakers of Mandarin dialects at the same time, and the dialects in those areas similarly closely resemble their relatives in the core Mandarin area. The Southwest was settled early, but the population fell dramatically for obscure reasons in the 13th century, and did not recover until the 17th century. The dialects in this area are now relatively uniform. However, long-established cities even very close to Beijing, such as Tianjin, Baoding, Shenyang, and Dalian, have markedly different dialects.

While Standard Mandarin was adopted as China's official language in the early 1900s, local languages continued to be dominant in their respective regions until the establishment of the People's Republic in 1949 and its promotion of this standard variant. Starting in the Cultural Revolution and intensifying afterwards, the Chinese Communist Party (CCP) has adopted a language policy that pushes for the usage of Standard Mandarin at the expense of other Chinese varieties, including the prohibition of their use in most public settings. As a result, Mandarin is now widespread throughout the country, including in regions where the language is not native.

This language policy has proven to be largely successful, with over 80% of the Chinese population being able to speak Standard Mandarin as of 2020. Nevertheless, despite active discouragement by the CCP, local Chinese and other ethnic languages continue to be the primary medium of communication in daily life in a handful of regions, most notably Guangdong (where Cantonese predominates) and Tibet. Elsewhere in China, Standard Mandarin has heavily influenced local languages through diglossia or in some cases, replaced them entirely (especially among younger generations in urban areas). The Chinese government's current goal is to have 85% of China speak Standard Mandarin by 2025 and for virtually the entire country to speak the language by 2035.

Unlike their compatriots on the southeast coast, few Mandarin speakers engaged in overseas emigration until the late 20th century, but there are now significant communities of them in cities across the world.

Taiwan

Standard Mandarin is the official language of Taiwan. The Taiwanese standard of Mandarin differs very little from that of mainland China, with differences largely in some technical vocabulary developed from the 1950s onwards.

Mandarin started to become widely spoken in Taiwan following the Kuomintang's relocation and influx of refugees from the mainland at the end of the Chinese Civil War in 1949. At the time Taiwanese Hokkien, and to a lesser extent Hakka, were the Chinese languages used among the local Han Chinese population, while the Formosan languages were natively spoken by many Aboriginal populations. These languages were heavily discouraged from use throughout the martial law period from 1949 to 1987, resulting in Mandarin replacing Taiwanese as the lingua franca. Starting in the 2000s, the Taiwanese government has made efforts to recognize these local languages and they are now present in public spheres such as media and education, although Mandarin remains the common language.

While the spoken standard of Taiwanese Mandarin is nearly identical to that of mainland China, the colloquial form has been heavily influenced by other local languages, especially Taiwanese. Notable differences include: the merger of retroflex sounds (zh, ch, sh, r) with the alveolar series (z, c, s), frequent mergers of the "neutral tone" with a word's original tone, and absence of erhua. Code-switching between Mandarin and Taiwanese Hokkien is common, as the majority of the population continues to also speak the latter as a native language.

Southeast Asia

Singapore

Mandarin is one of the four official languages of Singapore along with English, Malay, and Tamil. Historically, it was seldom used by the Chinese Singaporean community, which primarily spoke the Southern Chinese languages of Hokkien, Teochew, Cantonese, or Hakka. The launch of the Speak Mandarin Campaign in 1979 by the government prioritized the language over traditional vernaculars in an attempt to create a common ethnic language and foster closer connections to China. This has led to a significant increase and presence of Mandarin usage in the country, coupled with a strong decline in usage of other Chinese variants.

Standard Singaporean Mandarin is nearly identical to the standards of China and Taiwan, with minor vocabulary differences. It is the Mandarin variant used in education, media, and official settings. Meanwhile, a colloquial form called Singdarin is used in informal daily life and is heavily influenced in terms of both grammar and vocabulary by local languages such as Cantonese, Hokkien, and Malay. Instances of code-switching with English, Hokkien, Cantonese, Malay, or a combination of any of these is also common.

Malaysia

In Malaysia, Mandarin has been adopted by local Chinese-language schools as the medium of instruction with the standard based on that of Singapore. However, it is not as widespread in daily life among the Malaysian Chinese community, as Hokkien speakers continue to form a plurality among the ethnic Chinese population and Cantonese serves as the common language (especially in commerce and local media). An exception is in the state of Johor, where Mandarin is increasingly used alongside Cantonese as a lingua franca in part due to Singaporean influence. As in Singapore, the local colloquial variant of Mandarin exhibits influences from Cantonese and Malay.

Myanmar

In northern Myanmar, a Southwestern Mandarin variant close to the Yunnanese dialect is spoken by local Chinese and other ethnic groups. In some rebel group-controlled regions, Mandarin also serves as the lingua franca.

Subgroups

The classification of Chinese dialects evolved during the 20th century, and many points remain unsettled. Early classifications tended to follow provincial boundaries or major geographical features.

In 1936, Wang Li produced the first classification based on phonetic criteria, principally the evolution of Middle Chinese voiced initials. His Mandarin group included dialects of northern and southwestern China, as well as those of Hunan and northern Jiangxi.
Li Fang-Kuei's classification of 1937 distinguished the latter two groups as Xiang and Gan, while splitting the remaining Mandarin dialects between Northern, Lower Yangtze and Southwestern Mandarin groups.

The widely accepted seven-group classification of Yuan Jiahua in 1960 kept Xiang and Gan separate, with Mandarin divided into Northern, Northwestern, Southwestern and Jiang–Huai (Lower Yangtze) subgroups.
Of Yuan's four Mandarin subgroups, the Northwestern dialects are the most diverse, particularly in the province of Shanxi. The linguist Li Rong proposed that the northwestern dialects of Shanxi and neighbouring areas that retain a final glottal stop in the Middle Chinese entering tone (plosive-final) category should constitute a separate top-level group called Jin. He used this classification in the Language Atlas of China (1987). Many other linguists continue to include these dialects in the Mandarin group, pointing out that the Lower Yangtze dialects also retain the glottal stop.

The southern boundary of the Mandarin area, with the central Wu, Gan and Xiang groups, is weakly defined due to centuries of diffusion of northern features. Many border varieties have a mixture of features that make them difficult to classify.
The boundary between Southwestern Mandarin and Xiang is particularly weak, and in many early classifications the two were not separated. Zhou Zhenhe and You Rujie include the New Xiang dialects within Southwestern Mandarin, treating only the more conservative Old Xiang dialects as a separate group.
The Huizhou dialects have features of both Mandarin and Wu, and have been assigned to one or other of these groups or treated as separate by various authors. Li Rong and the Language Atlas of China treated it as a separate top-level group, but this remains controversial.

The Language Atlas of China calls the remainder of Mandarin a "supergroup", divided into eight dialect groups distinguished by their treatment of the Middle Chinese entering tone (see Tones below):

 Northeastern Mandarin (98 million), spoken in northeast China except the Liaodong Peninsula. This dialect is closely related to Standard Chinese, with little variation in lexicon and very few tonal differences.
 Beijing Mandarin (27 million), spoken in Beijing and environs such as Chengde and northern Hebei, as well as some areas of recent large-scale immigration, such as northern Xinjiang. The Beijing dialect forms the basis of Standard Chinese. This classification is controversial, as a number of researchers view Beijing and Northeastern Mandarin as a single dialect group.
 Jilu Mandarin (89 million), spoken in Hebei ("Ji") and Shandong ("Lu") provinces except the Shandong Peninsula, as well as in few counties of Heilongjiang, due to migration. Includes Tianjin dialect. Tones and vocabulary are markedly different. In general, there is substantial intelligibility with Beijing Mandarin.
 Jiaoliao Mandarin (35 million), spoken in Shandong (Jiaodong) and Liaodong Peninsulas, as well as in few counties of Heilongjiang, due to migration. Very noticeable tonal changes, different in "flavour" from Ji–Lu Mandarin, but with more variance. There is moderate intelligibility with Beijing.
 Central Plains Mandarin (186 million), spoken in Henan province, the central parts of Shaanxi in the Yellow River valley, eastern Gansu, as well as southern Xinjiang, due to recent migration. There are significant phonological differences, with partial intelligibility with Beijing. The Dungan language spoken in Kazakhstan and Kyrgyzstan belongs to this group.  Dungan speakers such as the poet Iasyr Shivaza have reported being understood by speakers of the Beijing dialect, but not vice versa.
 Lanyin Mandarin (17 million), spoken in central and western Gansu province (with capital Lanzhou) and Ningxia autonomous region (with capital Yinchuan), as well as northern Xinjiang.
 Lower Yangtze Mandarin (or Jiang–Huai, 86 million), spoken in the parts of Jiangsu and Anhui on the north bank of the Yangtze, as well as some areas on the south bank, such as Nanjing in Jiangsu, Jiujiang in Jiangxi, etc. There are significant phonological and lexical changes to varying degrees, and intelligibility with Beijing is limited. Lower Yangtze Mandarin has been significantly influenced by Wu Chinese.
 Southwestern Mandarin (260 million), spoken in the provinces of Hubei, Sichuan, Guizhou, Yunnan, and the Mandarin-speaking areas of Hunan, Guangxi and southern Shaanxi. There are sharp phonological, lexical, and tonal changes, and intelligibility with Beijing is limited to varying degrees.
The Atlas also includes several unclassified Mandarin dialects spoken in scattered pockets across southeastern China, such as Nanping in Fujian and Dongfang on Hainan.
Another Mandarin variety of uncertain classification is apparently Gyami, recorded in the 19th century in the Tibetan foothills, who the Chinese apparently did not recognize as Chinese.

Phonology

A syllable consists maximally of an initial consonant, a medial glide, a vowel, a coda, and tone. In the traditional analysis, the medial, vowel and coda are combined as a final.
Not all combinations occur. For example, Standard Chinese (based on the Beijing dialect) has about 1,200 distinct syllables.

Phonological features that are generally shared by the Mandarin dialects include:
 the palatalization of velar consonants and alveolar sibilants when they occur before palatal glides;
 one syllable contains maximum four phonemes (maximum three vowels and no consonant cluster) 
 the disappearance of final stop consonants and /-m/ (although in many Lower Yangtze Mandarin and Jin Chinese dialects, an echo of the final stops is preserved as a glottal stop);
 the presence of retroflex consonants (although these are absent in many Southwestern and Northeastern Mandarin dialects);
 the historical devoicing of stops and sibilants (also common to most non-Mandarin varieties).

Initials
The maximal inventory of initials of a Mandarin dialect is as follows, with bracketed pinyin spellings given for those present in the standard language:

 Most Mandarin-speaking areas distinguish between the retroflex initials  from the apical sibilants , though they often have a different distribution than in the standard language.  In most dialects of the southeast and southwest the retroflex initials have merged with the alveolar sibilants, so that zhi becomes zi, chi becomes ci, and shi becomes si.
 The alveolo-palatal sibilants  are the result of merger between the historical palatalized velars  and palatalized alveolar sibilants . In about 20% of dialects, the alveolar sibilants did not palatalize, remaining separate from the alveolo-palatal initials. (The unique pronunciation used in Peking opera falls into this category.) On the other side, in some dialects of eastern Shandong, the velar initials did not undergo palatalization.
For example, fei  "to fly" and hui  "grey" may be merged in these areas.
 People in many Mandarin-speaking areas may use different initial sounds where Beijing uses initial r- .
 Some dialects have initial  corresponding to the zero initial of the standard language.
 Many dialects of Northwestern and Central Plains Mandarin have  where Beijing has . Examples include  "pig" for standard zhū  ,  "water" for standard shuǐ  ,  "soft" for standard ruǎn  .

Finals
The medial , is lost after apical initials in several areas.
Thus Southwestern Mandarin has  "correct" where the standard language has dui .
Southwestern Mandarin also has  in some words where the standard has jie qie xie . This is a stereotypical feature of southwestern Mandarin, since it is so easily noticeable. E.g. hai "shoe" for standard xie, gai "street" for standard jie.

Mandarin dialects typically have relatively few vowels. Syllabic fricatives, as in standard zi and zhi, are common in Mandarin dialects, though they also occur elsewhere.

This is especially prevalent in the rhyme pairs -en/-eng  and -in/-ing . As a result, jīn "gold" and jīng "capital" merge in those dialects.

The Middle Chinese final stops have undergone a variety of developments in different Mandarin dialects (see Tones below). In Lower Yangtze dialects and some north-western dialects they have merged as a final glottal stop. In other dialects they have been lost, with varying effects on the vowel. As a result, Beijing Mandarin and Northeastern Mandarin underwent more vowel mergers than many other varieties of Mandarin. For example:

R-coloring, a characteristic feature of Mandarin, works quite differently in the southwest. Whereas Beijing dialect generally removes only a final  or  when adding the rhotic final -r , in the southwest the -r replaces nearly the entire rhyme.

Tones

In general, no two Mandarin-speaking areas have exactly the same set of tone values, but most Mandarin-speaking areas have very similar tone distribution. The exception to this rule lies in the distribution of syllables formerly ending in a stop consonant, which are treated differently in different dialects of Mandarin.

Middle Chinese stops and affricates had a three-way distinction between tenuis, voiceless aspirate and voiced (or breathy voiced) consonants.
In Mandarin dialects the voicing is generally lost, yielding voiceless aspirates in syllables with a Middle Chinese level tone and non-aspirates in other syllables.
Of the four tones of Middle Chinese, the level, rising and departing tones have also developed into four modern tones in a uniform way across Mandarin dialects; the Middle Chinese level tone has split into two registers, conditioned on voicing of the Middle Chinese initial, while rising tone syllables with voiced obstruent initials have shifted to the departing tone.
The following examples from the standard language illustrate the regular development common to Mandarin dialects (recall that pinyin d denotes a non-aspirate , while t denotes an aspirate ):

In traditional Chinese phonology, syllables that ended in a stop in Middle Chinese (i.e. /p/, /t/ or /k/) were considered to belong to a special category known as the "entering tone".
These final stops have disappeared in most Mandarin dialects, with the syllables distributed over the other four modern tones in different ways in the various Mandarin subgroups.

In the Beijing dialect that underlies the standard language, syllables beginning with original voiceless consonants were redistributed across the four tones in a completely random pattern. For example, the three characters , all tsjek in Middle Chinese (William H. Baxter's transcription), are now pronounced jī, jǐ and jì respectively.  Older dictionaries such as Mathews' Chinese-English Dictionary mark characters whose pronunciation formerly ended with a stop with a superscript 5; however, this tone number is more commonly used for syllables that always have a neutral tone (see below).

In Lower Yangtze dialects, a minority of Southwestern dialects (e.g. Minjiang) and Jin Chinese (sometimes considered non-Mandarin), former final stops were not deleted entirely, but were reduced to a glottal stop . (This includes the dialect of Nanjing on which the Postal Romanization was based; it transcribes the glottal stop as a trailing h.) This development is shared with Wu Chinese and is thought to represent the pronunciation of Old Mandarin. In line with traditional Chinese phonology, dialects such as Lower Yangtze and Minjiang are thus said to have five tones instead of four.  However, modern linguistics considers these syllables as having no phonemic tone at all.

Although the system of tones is common across Mandarin dialects, their realization as tone contours varies widely:

* Dialects in and around the Nantong area typically have many more than 4 tones, due to influence from the neighbouring Wu dialects.

Mandarin dialects frequently employ neutral tones in the second syllables of words, creating syllables whose tone contour is so short and light that it is difficult or impossible to discriminate. These atonal syllables also occur in non-Mandarin dialects, but in many southern dialects the tones of all syllables are made clear.

Vocabulary
There are more polysyllabic words in Mandarin than in all other major varieties of Chinese except Shanghainese. This is partly because Mandarin has undergone many more sound changes than have southern varieties of Chinese, and has needed to deal with many more homophones. New words have been formed by adding affixes such as lao-, -zi, -(e)r (/), and -tou (/), or by compounding, e.g. by combining two words of similar meaning as in cōngmáng, made from elements meaning "hurried" and "busy".
A distinctive feature of southwestern Mandarin is its frequent use of noun reduplication, which is hardly used in Beijing. In Sichuan, one hears bāobāo "handbag" where Beijing uses bāor.
There are also a small number of words that have been polysyllabic since Old Chinese, such as  "butterfly".

Dialects of Mandarin agree with each other quite consistently on these pronouns. While the first and second person singular pronouns are cognate with forms in other varieties of Chinese, the rest of the pronominal system is a Mandarin innovation (e.g., Shanghainese has non / "you" and yi  "he/she").

Because of contact with Mongolian and Manchurian peoples, Mandarin (especially the Northeastern varieties) has some loanwords from these languages not present in other varieties of Chinese, such as  "alley". Southern Chinese varieties have borrowed from Tai, Austroasiatic, and Austronesian languages.

In general, the greatest variation occurs in slang, in kinship terms, in names for common crops and domesticated animals, for common verbs and adjectives, and other such everyday terms. The least variation occurs in "formal" vocabulary—terms dealing with science, law, or government.

Grammar

Chinese varieties of all periods are considered prime examples of analytic languages, relying on word order and particles instead of inflection or affixes to provide grammatical information such as person, number, tense, mood, or case.
Although modern varieties, including the Mandarin dialects, use a small number of particles in a similar fashion to suffixes, they are still strongly analytic.

The basic word order of subject–verb–object is common across Chinese dialects, but there are variations in the order of the two objects of ditransitive sentences.
In northern dialects the indirect object precedes the direct object (as in English), for example in the Standard Chinese sentence:

In southern dialects, as well as many southwestern and Lower Yangtze dialects, the objects occur in the reverse order.

Most varieties of Chinese use post-verbal particles to indicate aspect, but the particles used vary.
Most Mandarin dialects use the particle -le (了) to indicate the perfective aspect and -zhe (着/著) for the progressive aspect.
Other Chinese varieties tend to use different particles, e.g. Cantonese zo2 咗 and gan2 紧/緊 respectively.
The experiential aspect particle -guo (过/過) is used more widely, except in Southern Min.

The subordinative particle de (的) is characteristic of Mandarin dialects.
Some southern dialects, and a few Lower Yangtze dialects, preserve an older pattern of subordination without a marking particle, while in others a classifier fulfils the role of the Mandarin particle.

Especially in conversational Chinese, sentence-final particles alter the inherent meaning of a sentence. Like much vocabulary, particles can vary a great deal with regards to the locale. For example, the particle ma (嘛), which is used in most northern dialects to denote obviousness or contention, is replaced by yo (哟) in southern usage.

Some characters in Mandarin can be combined with others to indicate a particular meaning just like prefix and suffix in English. For example, the suffix -er which means the person who is doing the action, e.g. teacher, person who teaches. In Mandarin the character 師 has the same function, it is combined with 教, which means teach, to form the word teacher.

List of several common Chinese prefixes and suffixes:

See also

 Chinese dictionary
 Transcription into Chinese characters
 Written Chinese
 Languages of China
 List of varieties of Chinese
 Linguistic Atlas of Chinese Dialects
 List of languages by number of native speakers

Notes

References

Citations

Sources
 Works cited

Further reading

Historical Western language texts

External links 

 Tones in Mandarin Dialects : Comprehensive tone comparison charts for 523 Mandarin dialects. (Compiled by James Campbell) – Internet Archive mirror

 
Articles containing video clips
Languages of China
Languages of Taiwan
Languages of Singapore
Languages of Malaysia
Chinese languages in Singapore
Subject–verb–object languages
Vertical vowel systems
Varieties of Chinese